KDSO (1300 AM, "K-Apple") is a radio station broadcasting a Christian radio format. Licensed to Phoenix, Oregon, in the United States, the station is currently owned by theDove Media, Inc.

History
On March 6, 1995, the station changed its call sign to KAPL.

On October 4, 2022, the station changed its call sign to KDSO.

References

External links

DSO
Phoenix, Oregon
DSO
Radio stations established in 1977
1977 establishments in Oregon